World championships in Baseball5
Qualification for Baseball5 competitions

The Youth Baseball5 World Cup (YBWSC) is a mixed-gender Baseball5 world championship consisting of 12 teams that will occur every two years, with the first edition starting in 2023. It is governed by the World Baseball Softball Confederation (WBSC). The 2025 edition will act as a qualifier for the mixed-gender Dakar 2026 Youth Olympics Baseball5 event, which will be Baseball5's first appearance at the Youth Olympics, as well as the first appearance of a mixed-gender team sport at an Olympic event.

History 
The YB5WC was initially scheduled to occur in 2021, but was postponed to 2023 due to the COVID-19 pandemic.

Qualification 
France and Turkey qualified from the first-ever U-17 European Baseball5 Championship in 2022 to play in the 2023 YB5WC.

See also 

 Baseball5 World Cup

References